"Mighty Mighty" is a song by R&B band Earth, Wind & Fire, released as a single in 1974 on Columbia Records. The single reached No. 4 on the Billboard Hot Soul Singles chart and No. 29 on the Billboard Hot 100.

Overview
Mighty Mighty was produced by Maurice White and Joe Wissert and composed by Maurice and Verdine White. Mighty Mighty also came off EWF's 1974 album Open Our Eyes.

Critical reception
Simon Warner of Popmatters described the song as "an infectious rhythm track built on a chunky guitar line, riddled with snaking, Sly-like horn refrains, and edged with the multiple vocal harmonies."
Alex Henderson of Allmusic also called Mighty Mighty "a gritty funk smoker".

Chart positions

References

1974 singles
1974 songs
Earth, Wind & Fire songs
Songs written by Verdine White
Songs written by Maurice White
Columbia Records singles